Cycloheptanone, (CH2)6CO, is a cyclic ketone also referred to as suberone. It is a colourless volatile liquid.  Cycloheptanone is used as a precursor for the synthesis of pharmaceuticals.

Synthesis 
In 1836, French chemist Jean-Baptiste Boussingault first synthesized cycloheptanone from the calcium salt of dibasic suberic acid. The ketonization of calcium suberate yields calcium carbonate and suberone:
Ca(O2C(CH2)6CO2) → CaCO3 + (CH2)6CO

Cycloheptanone is still produced by the cyclization and decarboxylation of suberic acid or suberic acid esters. This reaction is typically conducted in the gas phase at 400–450 °C over alumina doped with zinc oxide or cerium oxide.

Cycloheptanone is also produced by the reaction of cyclohexanone with sodium ethoxide and nitromethane. The resulting sodium salt of 1-(nitromethyl)cyclohexanol is added to acetic acid and shaken with hydrogen gas in the presence of W-4 Raney nickel catalyst. Sodium nitrite and acetic acid are then added to give cycloheptanone.

Cycloheptanone is also prepared by ring expansion of cyclohexanone with diazomethane as the methylene source.

Uses and reactions 
Cycloheptanone is a precursor to bencyclane, a spasmolytic agent and vasodilator.  Pimelic acid is produced by the oxidative cleavage of cycloheptanone. Dicarboxylic acids such as pimelic acid are useful for the preparation of fragrances and certain polymers.

Several microorganisms, including Mucor plumbeus, Mucor racemosus, and Penicillium chrysogenum, have been found to reduce cycloheptanone to cycloheptanol. These microorganisms have been investigated for use in certain stereospecific enzymatic reactions.

References

7